Rhodolaena acutifolia is a plant in the family Sarcolaenaceae. It is endemic to Madagascar. The specific epithet  is from the Latin meaning "sharp-leafed".

Description
Rhodolaena acutifolia grows as a small tree or shrub. Its leaves are small, subcoriaceous, elliptic in shape, tapering to a point and sharp at the base. The flowers are paired in solitary inflorescences on a long stem. The fruits are dark green, drying black.

Distribution and habitat
Rhodolaena acutifolia is only found in the east central regions of Analamanga, Alaotra-Mangoro and Analanjirofo. Two subpopulations of the trees are in Zahamena National Park.

Threats
Rhodolaena acutifolia is threatened by harvesting for timber. Due to shifting cultivation, future habitat loss is predicted at up to 50%.

References

acutifolia
Endemic flora of Madagascar
Plants described in 1884